Mohanna Waqes Al-Enezi (born 18 November 1983) is a Saudi professional footballer who plays as a right back for Al-Qaisumah.

Honours
Al-Batin
MS League: 2019–20

References

External links
 

1983 births
Living people
Saudi Arabian footballers
Al Batin FC players
Al-Tai FC players
Al-Qaisumah FC players
Saudi Fourth Division players
Saudi Second Division players
Saudi First Division League players
Saudi Professional League players
Association football fullbacks
Association football wingers